Vani Rani was a 2013 Indian Tamil-language soap opera that aired on Sun TV from 21 January 2013 to 8 December 2018 for 1,743 episodes. The show starred Radikaa Sarathkumar, Venu Arvind and Babloo Prithiveeraj.

This show was directed by C J Baskar and produced by Radaan Mediaworks. This was Radaan Mediaworks' longest-running serial and fourth longest-running Tamil serial after Chandralekha , Valli and Kalyana Parisu. The show started to re-telecast on Kalaignar TV from 19 July 2021 Monday to Saturday 10:00PM–10:30PM.

Radhika reprised the roles of Vani and Rani again in serial named Ponni C/O Vani Rani which is being aired in Kalaignar TV.

Plot
Identical twin-sisters, Vaani and Raani are raised by their uncle, Maanikkam, after their parents died. Raani sacrifices her education for Vaani, who aspires to be a lawyer. After years, Vaani becomes a successful lawyer and marries Bhoominaathan, a granite businessman. Raani marries Bhoominaathan's half-brother, Swaminaathan, a restaurant owner. Maanikkam's son, Manohar falls in love with Bhoominaathan's sister, Jyothi. Raani is forced to get them married, earning Vaani and Raani the wrath of their uncle and their mother-in-law, Angayarkanni. Vaani refuses to speak with Raani after that.

As years pass, Vaani and Bhoominaathan turn out to be very successful, while Raani and Swaminaathan are struggling since all of Swaminaathan's business turn out to be failures. Vaani has two sons, Suryanarayana and Gautham, while Rani has three children, Saravanan, Selvi and Thenmozhi. They all live in same house. Angayarkanni, who is jealous of Vaani and Raani's close relationship, enters and worsens the problems. Raani's elder daughter, Selvi falls in love and marries Rajesh with only Vaani as a chance witness, resulting in Vaani and Raani to get separated. However, Bhoominaathan later realizes his faults, turns over a new leaf and sends his mother away and tries to get the family together.

They get together but live in separate houses. Kadhir, a local don who has his vengeance against Raani's son, Saravanan, creates problems. Vaani's younger son, Gautham marries Kadhir's niece, Pooja to rescue Saravanan. Kadhir turns good after Pooja's marriage. Jyothi's daughter, Poongodi is involved in a love triangle between her cousins. Karthik and Saravanan. Selvi also faces numerous problems through her father-in-law, Kaali, Alamelu and Shenbagam, Shiva, Geetha, and Maalathy. Vaani's elder son, Suryanarayan marries Dimple, who hates Vaani. Gautham becomes a policeman and investigates a murder that took place in a quarry which was owned by GP. GP is also a prominent business magnate and industrialist who controls the Indian medicine mafia activity, and his son Arya was a famous criminal dealing in international illegal mafia activities. Gautham kills Arya, enraging GP and then GP vows revenge. GP tries killing Kathir but finally gets arrested by Gautham. Saravanan marries Pavithra.

The rivalry between Vaani and Akilaandaeshwari starts because of Suryanarayan's relationship with the latter's daughter, Janani during college days. They had a daughter, Riyah. Akilaandaeshwari's brother, Sudhakar murders Janani and frames Vaani. Akilaandaeshwari vows to take revenge against Vaani and Raani family. Raani's younger daughter, Thenmozhi falls off a hilltop and loses her memories. She is rescued by Chandrika and her brother, Poochi. Chandrika treats Thenmozhi like her late daughter, Bhavaani and refuses to give back Thenmozhi to Raani. Akilaandaeshwari helps her and forces her to smuggle drugs but Raani and Vaani save Thenmozhi, who regained her memory. Akilaandaeshwari and Sudhaakar begin a new plan with the help of Neela and Sanjay. Neela blackmails Saravanan and Surya through a plan and make money from them, and Sanjay takes Bhoominaathan's company with the help of Sudhaakar and creates confusion between Saaminaathan and Bhoominaathan.

Angayarkanni is murdered by Sanjay and Saaminaathan gets framed, occurring fights between Bhoominaathan and Saaminaathan. Sanjay plans to murder Saaminaathan and Raani. Meanwhile, the evidence that Sanjay was the murderer of Angayarkanni which was kept in Riyah's doll, reaches Saaminaathan and Raani. They blackmail Sanjay, who later exposed as murderer. Hence, Bhoominaathan and Saaminaathan are reunited. To save Vaani, Raani puts her life in danger. Vaani faints learning Raani's situation. After some emotional affection between the sisters, their health improves. Akilaandaeshwari finds that Janani is murdered by Sudhakar is arrested by Gautham, while apologizing for all of her mistakes from Vaani and Raani. Finally, the family remains united.

Cast

Main cast
 Radikaa Sarathkumar in a dual role as: 
 Advocate Vani Bhoominathan – Manikkam's elder niece; Rani's twin sister; Bhoomi's wife; Surya and Gautham's mother; Riya and Mano's grandmother
 Rani Saaminathan – Manikkam's younger niece; Vani's twin sister; Saami's wife; Saravanan, Selvi and Thenu's mother; Jr. Manikkam and Santhosh's grandmother
 Venu Arvind as Bhoominathan aka Bhoomi – Angayarkanni's son; Jyoti's brother; Saami's half-brother; Vani's husband; Surya and Gautham's father; Riya and Mano's grandfather
 Babloo Prithiveeraj as Saaminathan aka Saami – Angayarkanni's step-son; Bhoomi and Jyoti's half-brother; Rani's husband; Saravanan, Selvi and Thenu's father; Jr. Manikkam and Santhosh's grandfather

Recurring cast
 Vignesh Kumar as Gauthamkrishnan "Gautham" Bhoominathan – Vani and Bhoomi's younger son; Surya's brother; Pooja's husband 
 Navya Swamy as Pooja Karuppuswamy Gauthamkrishnan - Gautham's wife 
 Arun Kumar Rajan as Suryanarayanan "Surya" Bhoominathan – Vani and Bhoomi's elder son; Gautham's brother; Dimple's husband; Riya and Mano's father
Neelima Rani as Dimple Ponnambalam Suryanarayan – Ponnambalam and Alamelu's daughter; Surya's wife; Mano's mother
 Sujith Suprabha / Maanas Chavali as Saravanan Saaminathan – Rani and Saami's son; Selvi and Thenu's brother; Pavithra's husband; Santhosh's father
 Nikhila Rao / Niranjani Ashok as Selvi Saaminathan Rajesh – Rani and Saami's elder daughter; Saravanan and Thenu's sister; Rajesh's wife; Jr. Manikkam's mother
 Neha Menon as Thenmozhi "Thenu" Saaminathan / Bhavani (fake) – Rani and Saami's younger daughter; Saravanan and Selvi's sister
 Shruthi Shanmuga Priya as Pavithra Sadhasivam Saravanan – Sadhasivam and Mythili's daughter; Saravanan's wife; Santhosh's mother
 Guhan Shanmugam as Rajesh Kaliappan – Sundari and Kaliappan's son; Shanti's step-son; Malathi's half-brother; Selvi's husband; Jr. Manikkam's father
 Ravikumar as Manikkam – Shankari's widower; Vani and Rani's uncle; Mekala and Manohar's father; Karthik, Poongodi and Ganesha's grandfather
 Sivaji Manohar as Manohar Manikkam – Manikkam and Shankari's son; Mekala's brother; Jyoti's husband; Poongodi and Ganesha's father
 Gayathri Shastry / Jyothi Reddy / Roopa Sree / Premi Venkat as Jyoti Manohar – Angayarkanni's daughter; Bhoomi's sister; Saami's half-sister; Manohar's wife; Poongodi and Ganesha's mother
Mamilla Shailaja Priya as Akhilandeshwari – Sudhakar's sister; Janani and Sandhya's mother; Vani and Rani's enemy
 Rajendran as Ponnambalam – Dimple's father
 Srilekha Rajendran as Alamelu Ponnambalam – Dimple's mother
 "Saathappan" Nandakumar as Mayilvaganam – Dimple's uncle
 Joker Thulasi as Point – Vani's assistant
 Ramachandran Mahalingam as Sadasivam – Pavithra's father
 Dharini as Mythili Sadasivam – Pavithra's mother
 Chandrasekharan as Sudhakar – Akhilandeshwari's brother; Janani's murderer
 Shanthi Williams as Angayarkanni – Bhoomi and Jyothi's mother; Saami's step-mother; Surya, Gautham, Poongodi and Ganesha's grandmother; Saravanan, Selvi and Thenu's step-grandmother (Dead)
 Baboos as Kaaliappan – Alamelu's brother; Sundari and Shanti's husband; Rajesh and Malathi's father (Dead)
 Sangeetha Balan as Sundari Kaaliappan – Kaalippan's first wife; Rajesh's mother; Malathi's step-mother 
 Meenakshi Muruha as Shanti Kaaliappan – Kaalippan's second wife; Malathi's mother; Rajesh's step-mother
 Jyothi / Minnal Deepa as Malathi Kaalippan Aarumugam – Kaaliappan and Shanti's daughter; Sundari's step-daughter; Rajesh's half-sister; Aarumugam's wife
 Murali Krishnan as Aarumugam – Malathi's husband
 Andrew Jesudoss as Kadhiravan – Pooja's uncle; Pushpa's husband
 Sasikala Shree as Pushpa Kadhiravan – Kadhiravan's wife; Pooja's aunt (Dead)
 Sudha Pushpa as Sudha Karuppuswamy – Pooja's mother (Dead)
 Mohan as Karuppuswamy – Pooja's father (Dead)
 Kovai Desingu as Aasaan – Pooja's uncle; Mani's father
 Aravish Glitzy as Mani – Aasaan's son
 Raj Mithran as Balasubramaniam – Parvatham's brother; Mekala's husband; Karthik's father
 Veena Venkatesh as Mekala Manikkam Balasubramaniam – Manikkam and Shankari's daughter; Manohar's sister; Balasubramaniam's wife; Karthik's mother
 Nagalakshmi as Parvatham – Balasubramaniam's sister; Azhagumayil's mother
 Geethanjali as Azhagumayil – Parvatham's daughter
 Kavithalaya Krishnan as Krishnamurthy "Krishnan" – Vijayalakshmi's husband; Teju and Mithran's father (Dead)
 Nathan Shyam as Mithran Krishnan – Krishnan and Vijayalakshmi's son; Teju's brother
 Shamily Sukumar as Tejaswini "Teju" Krishnan – Krishnan and Vijayalakshmi's daughter; Mithran's sister
 Radha as Vijayalakshmi Krishnan – Krishnan's wife; Mithran and Teju's mother
 Sathya Sai as Sivagami
 Suhasini as Nandini Dheenadayalan
 Prakash Rajan as Dheenadayalan
 Nalini as Krishnaveni
 Mamathi Chari as 
 Kokila Saaminathan – Saami's fiancée (Dead) 
 Jessie – Kokila's look-alike 
 Anusha Rai as Tulasi – Mani's girlfriend (Dead)
 Usha Elizabeth as Tulasi's mother
 Sivakumar as Mahalingam
 Sumangali as Alamelu Thangarasu – Kaaliappan's sister; Thangarasu's wife; Shenbagam's mother
 Mohan as Thangarasu – Alamelu's husband; Shenbagam's father
 Sridevi Ashok as Shenbagam Thangarasu – Alamelu and Thangarasu's daughter (Dead)
 Kannayiram as Muthu
 Jayaraman Mohan as Shiva
 Vasu Vikram as Moorthy – Devika's father; Bhoomi's ex-partner (Dead)
 Sri Vidhya Shankar as Devika's mother
 Reshma Pasupuleti as Devika Moorthy
 Krishna Kishore as Krishna
 Nithya Ravindran as Savithri – Valli's mother
 Azhagu as House owner – Savithri's husband; Valli's father
 Nivetha as Valli – Savithri's daughter; Velu's cousin
 Vimal Raj as Kaththi Sekar
 Sathyajit as Kailash
 Bharath as Velu Naagaraj – Naagaraj and Muthupechi's son
 Ravi Chandran as Naagaraj – Velu's father (Dead)
 Deepa Shankar as Muthupechi Naagaraj – Velu's mother; House-owner's sister
 Mohan Sharma as Viswanathan – Agalya and Anjali's father
 Krithika Laddu as Agalya Viswanathan – Vishwanathan's daughter; Anjali's sister; Saravanan's late fiancée (Dead)
 Nivedhitha Pankaj as Anjali Viswanathan – Vishwanathan's daughter; Agalya's sister (Dead)
 Abhishek as Mugundhan
 Nakshatra Nagesh as Rudhra
 Meena Kumari as Rudhra's mother
 Vazhakku En Muthuraman as AC Anbuchelvan
 Madhuvanti Arun as Chandrika Eswar – Poochi's sister; Eswar's wife; Bhavani's mother; Thenu's foster mother
 Sai Swetha as Bhavani Eswar – Chandrika and Eswar's daughter (Dead)
 Bhanu Sri as Sandhya – Akhilandeshwari younger daughter; Janani's sister
 Priya as Janani – Akhilandeshwari's elder daughter; Surya's ex-fiancée; Riya's mother (Dead)
 Vasavi as Asha
 B. H. Tharun Kumar as Guru Paadham aka GP (Dead)
 Fawaz Zayani as Arya (Dead)
 C. Ranganathan as Haneef - Bhoominathan's friend

Music
The title song was written by lyricist Pa. Vijay, composed C. Sathya sung by Sakthisree Gopalan, Dharshini and Kaushik Menon. It was remade in three different languages.

Soundtrack

Adaptations

References

External links
 Official website 
 Sun TV on YouTube
 Sun TV Network 
 Sun Group 

Sun TV original programming
2013 Tamil-language television series debuts
2010s Tamil-language television series
Tamil-language television shows
2018 Tamil-language television series endings